The Mist and the Maiden, aka Mist & the Maiden, is a 2017 mystery thriller film directed and written by Andrés Koppel which stars Quim Gutiérrez, Verónica Echegui, Aura Garrido, and Roberto Álamo. It is an adaptation of Lorenzo Silva's novel.

Plot 
The plot takes place in the island of La Gomera (Canary Islands archipelago). It concerns about the criminal investigation carried out by Guardia Civil Sergeant Rubén Bevilacqua and Corporal Virginia Chamorro, who seek to reopen the case pertaining the discovery of a male corpse in the hazy forest three years before. To that end, they get in touch with Corporal Anglada, the last person to see the man alive.

Cast

Production 
Andrés Koppel directorial debut feature, the film was produced by Tornasol Films, Hernández y Fernández PC, Gomera Producciones, and Atresmedia Cine, with the participation of Atresmedia and Movistar+. Shooting locations included the islands of La Gomera and Tenerife.

Release 
The film was presented at the 20th Málaga Film Festival on 19 March 2017. Distributed by DeAPlaneta, it was theatrically reelased in Spain on 1 September 2017.

Reception 

Beatriz Martínez of Fotogramas considered that a big list of flaws and dissonant elements that include "bad performances, a script that cannot be understood, clumsy filming, ridiculous scenes, and impostured dialogues" turn the mystery thriller into an unintentional comedy.

Marta Medina of El Confidencial found the film's main flaw to be how "cumbersome and impossible" the narrative becomes as the investigation advances, with the underlying feeling upon watching the film being that of "a poorly-told good story".

Raquel Hernández Luján of HobbyConsolas rated the film with 45 points ("bad"), deeming it to be a "deficient" adaptation from which little can be saved, singling out Aura Garrido and the spectacular locations as positive points, but criticising elements such as the sound, editing, the "completely illogical and meaningless" plot resolution and the gratuitousness of the sex scenes.

Andrea G. Bermejo of Cinemanía rated the film 2½ out of 5 stars, underscoring as a veredict the film to be a "rounded and attractive thriller hampered by the 'star system'".

Luis Martínez of El Mundo rated the film 3 out of 5 stars, writing about an "imperfect, slightly inclined to pompousness" film, otherwise featuring a "stiff script", yet also about an "effective (perhaps too much in its attempt to reproduce archetypes) and perfectly murky thriller", also bringing together the best actors of the Spanish star system.

See also 
 List of Spanish films of 2017

References 

Films shot in the Canary Islands
Films set in the Canary Islands
2010s Spanish films
2010s Spanish-language films
Spanish mystery thriller films
2010s mystery thriller films
2017 thriller films
2017 directorial debut films
Tornasol Films films
Atresmedia Cine films
Films based on Spanish novels